Ashley Blazer Biden (born June 8, 1981) is an American social worker, activist, philanthropist, and fashion designer. Her parents are U.S. President Joe Biden and First Lady Jill Biden. She served as the executive director of the Delaware Center for Justice from 2014 to 2019. Prior to her administrative role at the center, she worked in the Delaware Department of Services for Children, Youth, and Their Families. Biden founded the fashion company Livelihood, which partners with the online retailer Gilt Groupe to raise money for community programs focused on eliminating income inequality in the United States, launching it at New York Fashion Week in 2017.

Early life and education 

Ashley Blazer Biden was born on June 8, 1981, in Wilmington, Delaware. Her father, Joe Biden, is the president of the United States and previously served as vice president. Biden is the only child from his second marriage to educator Jill Biden. She has two half-brothers, Hunter Biden and the late Beau Biden, and a half-sister, the late Naomi Biden, from her father's first marriage to the late Neilia Hunter Biden. Biden is a great-great-granddaughter of Edward Francis Blewitt. She is of English, French, and Irish descent on her father's side and English, Scottish, and Sicilian descent on her mother's side.

Biden was raised in the Catholic faith and was baptized at St. Joseph's on the Brandywine in Greenville, Delaware. During her childhood, her father served as a United States senator from Delaware and her mother worked as an educator.

Biden attended Wilmington Friends School, a private school run by the Religious Society of Friends in Wilmington. Biden graduated from Archmere Academy, a private Catholic school, in 1999. While at Archmere, her father's alma mater, she was a member of the lacrosse and field hockey teams. When Biden was in elementary school, she discovered that the cosmetics company Bonne Bell tested its products on animals. She wrote a letter to the company asking them to change their policy on animal testing. She later got involved in dolphin conservation, inspiring her father to work with Congresswoman Barbara Boxer to write and pass the 1990 Dolphin Protection Consumer Information Act. Biden made an appearance before members of the United States Congress to lobby for the legislation.

Biden earned her Bachelor of Arts degree in cultural anthropology from Tulane University. During her freshman year of college, she worked at Girls Incorporated, now Kingswood Academy, as a camp counselor. She also interned at a summer program at Georgetown University, working with youth from Anacostia.

Career 
After college, Biden worked as a waitress at a pizza shop in Wilmington for a few months before starting her career in social work. She moved to Kensington, Philadelphia, and started a job as a clinical support specialist at the Northwestern Human Services Children's Reach Clinic, assisting youth and their families with accessing resources and working directly with psychiatrists and therapists. She obtained a master's of social work degree from the University of Pennsylvania's School of Social Policy and Practice in 2010. She was one of twelve graduates who received the John Hope Franklin Combating American Racism Award. In 2015 she served as the commencement speaker at Rutgers University for the Rutgers School of Social Work.

Social work and activism 
Biden works as a social justice activist and social worker. After finishing graduate school, she gained a job at West End Neighborhood House, a non-profit organization, as their Employment and Education Liaison for adjudicating youth developing various employment and job skills training programs. She worked as a social worker in the Delaware Department of Services for Children, Youth, and Their Families for fifteen years.

While working for the department, Biden created programs for youth focusing on juvenile justice, foster care, and mental health. In 2008, she was listed in Delaware Todays "40 People to Watch" for her work in the department. In 2012, she joined the Delaware Center for Justice as an associate director, focusing on criminal justice reform in the state. She helped establish and run programs and services at the center focused on public education, adult victim services, gun violence, incarcerated women, and community reentry. Overseeing all direct servicing programs at the center, Biden worked with victims of crime, adjudicated youth, elderly prisoners, adults on probation and parole, truant youth, and Pennsylvania courts of common pleas clients who were eligible for mediation.

In 2014, she was promoted to executive director of the center, and served in that capacity until 2019. She implemented a program called SWAGG: Student Warriors Against Guns and Gangs, endorsed by the Office of Juvenile Justice and Delinquency Prevention, which provides educational resources and community-based support groups aimed at eliminating violent crimes and gang activity among youth in New Castle County.

In 2014, Biden criticized the death penalty, stating that it is not cost effective and wastes resources that could go towards victim services and crime prevention.

She founded the Young@Art program that provides resources and outlets for students to create artwork while they are detained in detention facilities, and then sells the art in the community. Half of the proceeds of the art go directly to the artists, and the other half goes into funding the program to buy art supplies and to pay the wages of youth who work at the community art shows. Through the program, Biden also teaches the students business and financial literacy skills.

In August 2020, Biden spoke at the 2020 Democratic National Convention before her father accepted the 2020 Democratic Presidential Nomination. On August 6, Biden hosted an organizing event for Wisconsin Women for Biden to discuss the Women's Agenda, released by her father's campaign, and bring awareness to women's issues in the 2020 United States presidential election.

Fashion 
In 2017, Biden launched the Livelihood Collection, an ethical fashion clothing brand, at Spring Place in TriBeCa during New York Fashion Week. The launch event was attended by Biden's parents and celebrities including Olivia Palermo and Christian Siriano. The brand collaborated with Gilt Groupe and Aubrey Plaza to raise $30,000 for the Delaware Community Foundation. Livelihood's logo, an arrow piercing through the letters "LH", was inspired by Biden's half-brother Beau, who died of brain cancer in 2015. Biden stated that "[Beau] was my bow. His cancer brought me to my knees. I had no choice but to shoot forward, keep going, keep aiming at my own dreams."

Biden created the brand to help combat income inequality and racial inequality in the United States. All the proceeds from the brand launch at New York Fashion Week were allocated to programs for communities in need. Ten percent of the brand's continued sales are donated to community organizations in the Anacostia neighborhood of Washington, D.C. and the Riverside in Wilmington. Livelihood's products are made with American-sourced organic cotton and are manufactured in the United States. She decided to design hoodies due to their connection to the Labor Movement, and their symbolic significance toward social justice movements. The brand's website provides information about civic engagement and economic justice.

Along with Colleen Atwood, Barbara Tfank, Rachel Zoe, Bibhu Mohapatra, Betsey Johnson, Calvin Klein, Oscar de la Renta, Anna Sui, Paul Tazewell, and other designers and fashion houses, Biden designed outfits for  vinyl dolls of the Peanuts characters Snoopy and Belle for the 2017 Snoopy and Belle in Fashion exhibition. The exhibition kicked off on September 7, 2017, at Brookfield Place in Manhattan. It toured in San Diego, Los Angeles, and several other cities throughout the United States before closing on October 1, 2017.

In June 2020, Biden designed the uniforms for the staff at the Hamilton Hotel in Washington, D.C. as an offshoot of her Livelihood Collection The uniforms were unveiled at a private launch party. The hotel donated $15,000 to Livelihood.

Personal life 

In 2010, she began dating Howard Krein, a plastic surgeon and otolaryngologist, after being introduced by her brother, Beau. Krein is a graduate of Rutgers University and Thomas Jefferson Medical College. They married in a Catholic-Jewish interfaith ceremony at St. Joseph's on the Brandywine in 2012. Her husband, who is Jewish, works at Thomas Jefferson University Hospital in Philadelphia and is an assistant professor of facial, plastic, and reconstructive surgery.

Biden is a practicing Catholic. She joined her husband, father, and brother in a private audience with Pope Francis in the Vatican in 2016.

Diary theft 
In 2020, a diary Biden kept was stolen and sold to the right-wing activist group Project Veritas. Two Florida residents pled guilty in 2022 to conspiring to transport her stolen diary across state lines as well as other personal items.

References

External links

 

1981 births
Living people
21st-century Roman Catholics
Activists from Delaware
American fashion businesspeople
American fashion designers
American people of English descent
American people of French descent
American people of Irish descent
American people of Italian descent
American people of Scottish descent
American social justice activists
American social workers
American women fashion designers
American women philanthropists
Ashley
Catholics from Delaware
Children of presidents of the United States
Children of vice presidents of the United States
Daughters of national leaders
Delaware Democrats
Philanthropists from Delaware
Tulane University alumni
University of Pennsylvania School of Social Policy and Practice alumni